Bernard Richard O'Brien (14 May 1909 – 9 January 1955) was an Australian rules footballer who played with Footscray and Carlton in the Victorian Football League (VFL).

Family
His brother, Walter Joseph O'Brien (1907-1983), also played for Footscray.

Football
A Railways recruit, O'Brien played 18 games for Footscray in 1929 and 1930, his first stint at the club.

In 1931 he played for Carlton.

In 1932 he was captain-coach of Yinnar.

He returned to Footscray in 1933 and brought up his 100th league game in his only league appearance in 1938.

O'Brien, who represented Victoria twice in 1937, left Footscray in 1939 to coach Horsham.

Death
He died at his residence in Footscray, Victoria on 9 January 1955.

Notes

1909 births
1955 deaths
Australian rules footballers from Melbourne
Western Bulldogs players
Carlton Football Club players
Horsham Football Club players
People from Footscray, Victoria